Parliamentary elections were held in Cape Verde on 22 January 2006. The result was a victory for the ruling African Party for the Independence of Cape Verde (PAICV) run by José Maria Neves, which won 41 of the 72 seats in the National Assembly.  Second was the Movement for Democracy (Mpd) and third was Democratic and Independent Cape Verdean Union (UCID) led by João Santos dos Luís.

Campaign
The PAICV and the MpD (led by Ulisses Correia e Silva) were the only parties to nominate a candidate in every constituency.

Results

References

External links
National Elections Commission 

Elections in Cape Verde
Cape Verde
Parliamentary
January 2006 events in Africa